Judith Peace Achan (born 23 April 1983) is a Ugandan politician and member of the parliament. She was elected in office as a woman Member to represent Nwoya district during the 2021 Uganda general elections.

She is a member of the  National Resistance Movement party.

In the eleventh parliament, she serves on the Committee on Foreign Affairs.

See also 
 List of members of the eleventh Parliament of Uganda
 Nwoya District

References

External links 
 Website of the Parliament of Uganda.

Members of the Parliament of Uganda
Women members of the Parliament of Uganda
Living people
21st-century Ugandan women politicians
21st-century Ugandan politicians
1983 births